Timon Marshall (born August 7, 1979) is an American football wide receiver who is currently a free agent. He has most recently played for the Corpus Christi Fury in the American Indoor Football League. He also played for the Kansas City Chiefs of the National Football League.

Marshall played college football at Ottawa University, and eventually played for the Grand Rapids Rampage in the Arena Football League.

Marshall caught 102 receptions for 1,134 yards and 27 touchdowns, while leading the AFL with 1,901 yards and six touchdowns as a kick returner. His efforts attracted the attention of the Chicago Bears of the National Football League, who welcomed him to one of their practice sessions on June 6, 2007. He competed for a spot as a starting wide receiver against Rashied Davis, who coincidentally played in the Arena League before signing with the Bears. Marshall was released by the Bears on August 27, 2007.

In 2013, Marshall signed with the Corpus Christi Fury of the Ultimate Indoor Football League.

Notes

External links
 Los Angeles Avengers' player page
 AFL stats at ArenaFan

1979 births
Living people
American football wide receivers
Tulsa Talons players
Grand Rapids Rampage players
Chicago Bears players
Los Angeles Avengers players
Ottawa Braves football players
Oklahoma City Yard Dawgz players
Corpus Christi Fury players